Acantholipes aurea is a species of moth in the family Erebidae. It is found in Cape Verde, Saudi Arabia, Senegal and Yemen.

References

aurea
Moths described in 1966
Moths of Africa
Moths of Asia
Moths of Cape Verde